Golden Meadow  is a town along Bayou Lafourche in Lafourche Parish, Louisiana, United States. The population was 1,761 in 2020. It is part of the Houma–Bayou Cane–Thibodaux metropolitan statistical area. Its main source of revenue is the oil and gas industry. The fishing and seafood industries also have strong economic impacts, with charter fishing, restaurants, and lodging actively serving patrons. The town was once known as a speed trap, but it has since been bypassed by Hwy 3235 and city traffic has been reduced to mostly locals; however, the speed limit is reduced to 50 mph on Hwy 3235 and said highway is still patrolled heavily. As in other places in Louisiana, there is a noticeable presence of Cajun culture, music, and cuisine.

The Golden Meadow name was given by the original land grant owners, Benjamin and Louisa Hobbs Barker of Illinois. In 1839, they named it so because of the yellow flowers growing everywhere. They hoped to become wealthy selling lots to French and English settlers, but abandoned the plan.

Geography
Golden Meadow is located at  (29.388192, -90.269457).

Demographics

As of the 2020 United States census, there were 1,761 people, 754 households, and 535 families residing in the town.

Government and infrastructure
On July 1, 1950 the town marshal, the first head law enforcement agent of the town, took his position and became the first head of the town police department.

The United States Postal Service operates the Golden Meadow Post Office.

Education

Lafourche Parish Public Schools operates public schools:
 Golden Meadow Lower Elementary School
 Golden Meadow Upper Elementary School
 Golden Meadow Middle School

South Lafourche High School is in the Galliano census-designated place, north of Golden Meadow, and serves the community.

Francophone private schools were the first educational institutions serving the community. In 1917 the first public elementary school opened. Golden Meadow High School opened in 1933. It was consolidated with Larose-Cut Off High School to form South Lafourche High School in 1966. The former Golden Meadow High building is currently Golden Meadow Middle School.

Lafourche Parish Library operates the Golden Meadow Branch.

Notable natives and residents
Dee Dee Blanchard, notable homicide victim
Dick Guidry, former member of the Louisiana House of Representatives from Lafourche Parish; graduated from Golden Meadow High School.

References

External links

Town of Golden Meadow

Towns in Lafourche Parish, Louisiana
Towns in Louisiana
Towns in Houma – Thibodaux metropolitan area